Anton Strohmayer, (25 January 1848 – 20 December 1937), born in Lichtental, Vienna, was an Austrian musician.  His instruments were contraguitar and clarinet; a founding member of the "Schrammel Brothers Specialities Quartet", he played Schrammelmusik. 

His father, Alois Strohmayer (1822-1890) was a composer.  Strohmayer studied the guitar with his father Alois. As a boy, he already had similar ability to the brothers Johann and Josef Schrammel, two renowned Austrian guitarists who were taken in by his father to play guitar in restaurants across the city. At age 12, Strohmayer was taken by his father to play, for the first time at the "Green Hunter" in the Prater.

In 1862 he played with Johann, Kaspar and Josef Schrammel in Hernals; from 1866 he played with Georg Dänzer and Josef Turnofsky; from 1873 in Wr. National Quartet, 1877 in the First Wr. National Quintet and from 1878 with Johann and Joseph Schrammel in the successful Nußdorfer Terzett (Gebrüder Schrammel and S.), which was expanded by the inclusion of dancer in 1884 to the quartet Gebr. Schrammel, Dänzer and S.

After the separation of the brothers Schrammel 1892 the quartet Danzer and S. 1893 concerted S. on the Weltausst. in Chicago with Bela Kürty and Johann Wächter (violins), Dänzer (G-clarinet and posthorn), his son Willy S. (Guitar and harmonica) as well as the singers Marie Kiesel (see Koerber M. v.), Gusti Reverelli, Georg Edler, brothers Hirsch and the art piping Hans Tranquillini ("Baron Jean") as quintet Dänzer and S. 1895 he acquired a Singspielhallen Concession and played as clarinettist in Wr. Specialty Quartet A. S., 1905 he played in the Maxim Quartet; the later participation in various S. ensembles is uncertain.

S., who also played the violin, withdrew early from playing music. After the death of Danze (1893), with whom he often performed in duets, he was considered the last representative of the G-clarinet. His real. Significance, however, lies in the participation as a contragitarrist in the ensemble of the brothers Schrammel.Musical. also successful were two of S's sons: Willy S. (1875-1959) as a harmonica player and singer, Franz S. (1881-1948) as a lieder singer.

His grave is located on the Dornbacher cemetery in Vienna.

See also 

Josef Schrammel
Johann Schrammel

References

Literature 

 
 Margarethe Egger: Die „Schrammeln“ in ihrer Zeit. Österreichischer Bundesverlag, Wien 1989, .

External links 

 Strohmayer in Baden bei Wien. — Siehe: Im Grinzinger Garten […] Badener Zeitung, 24. Juli 1926, S. 4, unten Mitte ÖNB/ANNO AustriaN Newspaper Online

1848 births
1937 deaths
Austrian male musicians
Musicians from Vienna